A by-election was held for the New South Wales Legislative Assembly electorate of Ryde on 14 September 1940 following the resignation of Eric Spooner, to contest the federal seat of Robertson at the 1940 election, at which he was elected.

Dates

Candidates
 Bert Cowell was a grocer from Gladesville.
 William Harrison was an estate agent from West Ryde and the Mayor of Ryde, the youngest to hold that office.
 Herbert Mitchell was a secretary and superintendent of the Central District Ambulance.
 James Stewart was a tyre moulder, representing the far-left Hughes-Evans group, which had been removed as the  executive in July 1940.
Arthur Williams was an accountant specialising in the auditing of trade unions.

Result

Eric Spooner resigned to successfully contest the 1940 election for Robertson.

See also
Electoral results for the district of Ryde
List of New South Wales state by-elections

References

1940 elections in Australia
New South Wales state by-elections
1940s in New South Wales